TGcom was an Italian news website owned by Mediaset, launched on March 8, 2001. The website contained mainly Italian and international news coverage, as well as political and entertainment news. TGCOM was closely linked to its sister department website, that of TGFIN, based on Il Sole 24 Ore Radiocor bulletins. TGCOM brand was also used to produce news bulletins on Mediaset television channels.
TGCOM was closed November 28, 2011, the day in which it was replaced by TGcom24.

External links 
 TGCOM 
 TGFIN 

Italian news websites
Mediaset
Internet properties established in 2001